Abdullah bin Amer Alswaha (Arabic: عبدالله بن عامر السواحه) is the current Minister of Communications and Information Technology in Saudi Arabia. His ministry is responsible for developing Saudi Arabia's ICT infrastructure and workforce as part of the country's Vision 2030 programme. He was previously managing director of Cisco Saudi Arabia.

Education 

Alswaha has bachelors degrees in computer science and electrical engineering. He studied as an undergraduate in Seattle and at the King Fahd University of Petroleum and Minerals. He has since done executive education programs at Harvard Business School.

Public Service 

On May 3, 2021, the Custodian of the Two Holy Mosques King Salman bin Abdulaziz issued a Royal Decree appointing Alswaha to the post of chairman of the Saudi Space Commission.

In March of the same year, he was appointed as chairman of the board of directors for the King Abdulaziz City for Science and Technology.

He is also Minister of Communications and Information Technology, and Chairman of the Communications and Information Technology Commission (CITC),  posts he has held since April of 2017.

Private Sector Career 
Alswaha began his career in 2005 at Cisco Saudi Arabia, becoming director of operations and overseeing the development of the company's systems engineering, public sector, commercial, service provider and channel operations. In May 2016, he was appointed managing director.

High Profile Participations 
At the Future Investment Initiative conference in Riyadh in October 2017, Alswaha announced a partnership between his ministry, the philanthropic organisation MiSK, and the Mohammed bin Salman College for Business and Entrepreneurship to put young local entrepreneurs and start-ups through a one-year training programme with big tech partners from the US and Europe. The same month he announced that Saudi Post, the government-operated postal system, would enter a five-year ‘corporatization phase’ before full privatization.

He has previously affirmed Saudi Arabia's commitment to business-friendly policy and has called for greater empowerment of women in the kingdom as part of the push to modernize its economy and workforce.

At the World Economic Forum in Davos in January 2018 Alswaha outlined Saudi Arabia's digital vision, announcing spending of $3 billion to roll out a nationwide 5G network and connect two million homes with high speed fiber optic.

At the Mobile World Congress in Barcelona, Alsawaha announced that in the framework of the Saudi Vision 2030, Saudi Arabia is planning to be a leading digital market in the Middle East and South Africa regions. Moreover, with the annual budget of $22 billion in the digital and IT sector, Saudi Arabia has become of the top ranked digital markets worldwide.

Primary Responsibilities 

 Cabinet Minister of the Kingdom of Saudi Arabia 
 Ministry of Communications and Information Technology
 Saudi Space Commission, Chairman
 The Research, Development and Innovation Authority , Chairman
 Digital Government Authority , Chairman
 King Abdulaziz City for Science and Technology, Chairman

Additional Responsibilities and Affiliations 

 Communications and Information Technology Commission (CITC), Chairman
 The Research, Development and Innovation Authority , Chairman
 Digital Government Authority , Chairman 
 Saudi Space Commission , Chairman 
 King Abdulaziz City for Science and Technology, Chairman
 Saudi Post, Chairman
 National Committee for Digital Transformation, Chairman
 Board Member, Misk Foundation
 Board Member, Neom
 Board Member,  Council of Economic and Development Affairs
 Board Member, Economic Cities Authority
 Board Member, World Economic Forum Centre for the Fourth Industrial Revolution Global Network Advisory

Previous positions 

Abdullah Alswaha formerly held other positions, including member of the Technology Advisory Board at Prince Mohammed Bin Fahd University (PMU). He was also the founder of the Social Entrepreneurship Incubator, which supports entrepreneurs to develop solutions in the fields of healthcare and education.

References 

Government ministers of Saudi Arabia
Communications in Saudi Arabia
Year of birth missing (living people)
Living people